Yerevan Mall is a shopping mall located on Arshakunyats Avenue, Yerevan, Armenia. Opened in 2014, it is the largest mall in Armenia in terms of number of stores and total floor area.

Carrefour hypermarket was opened in the mall on March 11, 2015.

KinoPark, a movie theater, and Captain Kid's treasure island, the biggest indoor entertainment center in Armenia, are located at Yerevan Mall.

Yerevan Mall operates under the management of Galaxy Group of Companies, a holding company founded in 1999.

History
Yerevan Mall shopping centre was opened on February 20, 2014, with the presence of president Serzh Sargsyan. The project was launched in late 2010.

In 2014, Captain Kid's treasure island, the biggest indoor entertainment center in Armenia, was opened at Yerevan Mall.

In 2015, the first and only Carrefour hypermarket in Armenia was opened at Yerevan Mall. Carrefour introduces itself in Armenia with the slogan “Low prices every day.” According to its business style Carrefour has brought a new culture of retail trade to Armenia and presents the best combination of price and quality.

In 2015, KinoPark multiplex movie theater was opened at Yerevan Mall.

At the end of December, 2015, Yerevan Mall launched its mobile application both for iOS and Android smartphones. It's the first mall application in Armenia and provides information on all ongoing sales and promotions. Besides a number of exciting features, Yerevan Mall mobile application allows users to purchase an online movie ticket in the KinoPark section.

In 2016, Yerevan Mall launched its customer loyalty program, Club Card project, which is the biggest loyalty project with its prizes and number of cardholders in retail sphere in Armenia. First Club Card lottery was held on the 27th of January, where hundred most active cardholders won expensive prizes, including Mini Cooper luxury car.

In 2016, the only Mango Man in Armenia was opened at Yerevan Mall.

Entertainment

On December 5, 2015, the KinoPark multiplex movie theater was opened in the mall. KinoPark owns 4K ULTRA HD quality projectors, Dolby Atmos quality sound, 6 comfortable halls with the best technology. One of the halls is premium, which has 30 self-controlled comfortable seats.

The mall has a number of cafes and a big food court with more than 20 operators, providing foods from 12 cuisines of the world.

Stores

Yerevan Mall is home to a variety of retailers including:

Zara
Stradivarius
Mango
Pull & Bear
NewYorker
Bershka
Kira Plastinina
Carpisa
Giordano
Monsoon
Accessorize
F&F
Okaïdi
Levi's
Celio
Aldo
Crocs
OVS
LC Waikiki
Tape à l'oeil
Jennyfer
Julia & More
Baldi
KFC
Goody's Burger House
Black Star Burger
Carrefour retailers

References

External links
Official website

Shopping malls in Armenia
Tourist attractions in Yerevan
Buildings and structures in Yerevan
Shopping malls established in 2015
2015 establishments in Armenia